Woghere is an English surname. Notable people with the surname include:

John Woghere, MP for East Grinstead in 1414 and 1421, son of Richard
Richard Woghere, MP for East Grinstead in 1388, 1399, 1402 and 1407

English-language surnames